Oompas, now discontinued, were candy produced under the Willy Wonka brand name. They were labeled as ‘Peanut Butter Oompas’.

The candy produced from 1971 to 1983 was similar to today's Reese's Pieces and peanut butter M&M's (though bigger). Under the candy coating was a candy disk of one-half peanut butter, and one-half chocolate. In 1980, they were briefly available in a chocolate and strawberry (instead of peanut butter) variety.

In 2001, Wonka, now a Nestlé subsidiary, revived the brand name for a chewy Skittles-like candy that came in a variety of fruit flavors: Green Apple, Cherry, Lemon, Orange, Grape, and Strawberry. These were simply labeled ‘Oompas’.

The UK version had a different, more eccentric flavour variety: jam doughnut, rhubarb and custard, snozzberry (mixed fruit), popcorn, caterpillar (cucumber) and mashed potato.

They were named after The Oompa-Loompas from the Roald Dahl children's book Charlie and the Chocolate Factory, from which the Wonka company takes its name.

External links 
 Oompas - Peanut Butter Wrapper
 Oompas - Candy Blog

The Willy Wonka Candy Company brands
Nestlé brands
Candy